Karmin international is a Taiwanese boatbuilding company specializing in the design of high speed rigid inflatable boats.

History
Karmin international was founded in 1988 as Pro Ocean Yacht and originally focused on producing recreational fishing boats however strong demand from the Coast Guard caused them to focus on rigid inflatable boats.

In 2020 Karmin won a NT$450-million (US$14.9-million) Taiwanese Navy contract for 18 special operations boats and 8 tenders for the Cheng Kung-class frigates.

In 2021 Karmin began delivery of a new class of 11m assault RIB to the ROC Marines. It is designated the M109 fast assault boat in ROCMC service and features a thermal imaging system produced by Kolead Aerospace.

Karmin has assisted a team from National Cheng Kung University (NCKU) in constructing a human powered submarine.

Customers
Karmin has supplied boats to the Taiwanese Navy and Coast Guard as well as export customers including the Republic of the Marshall Islands.

Products
 k85 assault boat
 k92 assault boat
 M109 assault boat

See also
 Defense industry of Taiwan

References

Shipbuilding
Defence companies of Taiwan